Neural Wiskott-Aldrich syndrome protein is a protein that in humans is encoded by the WASL gene.

The Wiskott-Aldrich syndrome (WAS) family of proteins share similar domain structure, and are involved in transduction of signals from receptors on the cell surface to the actin cytoskeleton. The presence of a number of different motifs suggests that they are regulated by a number of different stimuli, and interact with multiple proteins. Recent studies have demonstrated that these proteins, directly or indirectly, associate with the small GTPase, Cdc42, known to regulate formation of actin filaments, and the cytoskeletal organizing complex, Arp2/3. The WASL gene product is a homolog of WAS protein, however, unlike the latter, it is ubiquitously expressed and shows highest expression in neural tissues. It has been shown to bind Cdc42 directly, and induce formation of long actin microspikes.

According to one study, mouse DAB1 regulates actin cytoskeleton through N-WASP.

Diseases associated with WASL include Wiskottt-Aldrich Syndrome and Vaccinia.

Interactions 

WASL (gene) has been shown to interact with:

 CDC42,
 Cortactin 
 NCK1, 
 Profilin 1,  and
 RHOQ.

References

Further reading